"Bailando" is a song by Spanish singer-songwriter Enrique Iglesias for his tenth studio album Sex and Love  (2014). Written by Iglesias with long-time collaborator Descemer Bueno, the first and Spanish version was released with Cuban artists Bueno and Gente de Zona. Shortly afterward, the official version of the song was released by Universal Republic Records as the sixth single from the album. The song spent 41 weeks at No. 1 on the Billboard Hot Latin Songs chart. "Bailando" was produced by Carlos Paucar.

As of 24 August 2014, there are three other versions of the song that have been released to the music market besides the original Spanish version. The Spanglish version features Jamaican singer Sean Paul. Iglesias also released two Portuguese versions of the song: one version of the song in Portuguese destined for Brazilian market with additional vocals by Brazilian singer Luan Santana, and the other Portuguese version destined for the Portuguese market featured the additional vocals of the Portuguese singer Mickael Carreira.

The original Spanish version of "Bailando" served as the theme song of the soap opera Reina de Corazones which aired on Telemundo. According to the IFPI, Bailando was the tenth best-selling song of 2014 with 8 million units (sales plus track-equivalent streams) worldwide.

Background
In an interview Iglesias gave to Univision Musica, backstage at the Premios lo Nuestro he told the reporter that when Bueno presented the song to him, he initially did not like it and did not want to record it. But after recording he loved the song. He termed it as one of his favorites from the album.

Controversy
The Peruvian singer and composer Sergio Pelo D'ambrosio Robles reported that the song "Bailando" (signed by the Cuban Descemer Bueno) by Enrique Iglesias, copied the intro and the chorus of his song "Lejos de ti". A few months later, however, the Peruvian singer decided to withdraw the complaint because experts indicated that there was nothing copied in the lyrics nor in the chorus.

In Vietnam, the singer and composer  released the song "Đắng lòng thanh niên" in July 2014 and borrowed the beat from "Bailando" without permission from Enrique Iglesias.  It featured with the Avatar Boys Band to become a phenomenon on social networks, despite the mixed opinions.

Music video
Accompanying music videos for both, the Spanish and the Spanglish versions of "Bailando" were filmed in Santo Domingo, Dominican Republic. The video for Spanish version was premiered through Univision on 10 April 2014 and was premiered worldwide on 11 April 2014 through Iglesias' official Vevo account for the Spanglish version through Vevo on 13 June 2014, next the Brazil Portuguese version with Brazilian singer Luan Santana through Vevo on 7 July 2014, and the Portugal Portuguese version with Portugal singer Mickael Carreira on 22 August 2014 through Iglesias' official Vevo account too.

The music video is directed by Cuban producer Alejandro Perez, under Enrique Iglesias' longtime collaborators creative director Yasha Malekzad & executive producer Kasra Pezeshki. The music video was produced by Artist Preserve, London.
The featured dancers are from Havana's Ballet Lizt Alfonso.
The lead female dancer in the video is Ana Karla Suarez.
The video production in the Dominican Republic was produced by Aquiles Jimenez. On YouTube, the Spanish version of the video has been viewed over 3.1 billion times while the English version of the video has received over 490 million views as of April 26, 2022. It is his most viewed video on YouTube, surpassing his 2010 hit "I Like It".  The Spanish version of the video is the 17th most viewed video on YouTube. "Bailando" became the first Spanish-language music video to have been viewed over a billion times.

Synopsis
The video starts black and white in a living room, with Bueno singing parts of "Bailando" while Iglesias and Gente de Zona are having fun in the background, before starting to sing along with Bueno. As the song starts, Iglesias, Bueno and Gente de Zona walk the streets of a city, surrounded by working people and kids who juggle soccer balls. They are then seen performing the song in a tunnel, running through a street market and a troop of flamenco dancers showing off their moves. Shortly after, Iglesias is seen to be seduced by a brunette (Ana Karla Suarez) showing her best dance moves. The video ends with Enrique and Co. running back after they hear police sirens approaching them.

Critical reception
Billboard described the video as spectacular and mentioned that "a young Cuban flamenco troupe swirling in red dresses meet up with street dancers with some mad soccer skills in one of the best choreographed encounters since the Sharks met the Jets."
Huffington Post also mentioned that the video has a little football and a sensual dance.

Live performances
Iglesias first performed the Spanish version of "Bailando" on Today in New York City. in a set that included "I'm a Freak", and "Heart Attack". He would go on to perform the song on that year's Nuestra Belleza Latina, Billboard Latin Music Awards and included in a medley with El Perdedor at the Premios Juventud.

Iglesias' first televised performance of the English version at Macy's Fourth of July Fireworks Spectacular and went on to perform the song at America's Got Talent, Good Morning America in set that included Hero and I'm a Freak. He would also perform the song on So You Think You Can Dance and Fashion Rocks and performed the song as a medley with I'm a Freak at the MTV Europe Music Awards and finally at Pitbull's New Year's Revolution.

Track listing

CD single – Netherlands
"Bailando"  – 4:02

CD single – English version without rap
"Bailando"  – 4:02

Digital download
"Bailando"  – 4:02
"Bailando"  – 4:03

Digital download – Brazil version
"Bailando"  – 4:03

Digital download – Portugal version
"Bailando"  – 4:03

Digital download – Remixes
"Bailando"  – 4:20
"Bailando"  – 3:52
"Bailando"  – 3:57
"Bailando"  – 3:31
"Bailando"  – 4:05
"Bailando"  – 5:22
"Bailando"  – 5:08
"Bailando"  – 6:00

Digital download – Remixes
"Bailando"  – 4:20
"Bailando"  – 3:52
"Bailando"  – 3:57
"Bailando"  – 3:31
"Bailando"  – 4:05
"Bailando"  – 5:22
"Bailando"  – 5:08
"Bailando"  – 3:33
"Bailando"  – 3:12
"Bailando"  – 3:33
"Bailando"  – 4:03
"Bailando"  – 4:02

Commercial performance
The song has since become the most commercially successful song from Sex and Love, charting in more than 50 countries worldwide and it is most successful in Spanish and Portuguese speaking region, topping the charts in Colombia, Dominican Republic, Mexico, Portugal, Spain, and the Latin based charts in the United States. The song debuted at number 81 on the US Billboard Hot 100. The Spanish version of the song has peaked at number 12, making it Iglesias' highest-charting Spanish song of his career on the chart, surpassing the peak of "Loco". It is also his first top 20 hit on the chart since 2011's "Dirty Dancer". The song became Enrique's 13th number-one on the Hot Dance Club Songs chart. As of October 2014, it has crossed the 1,000,000 mark for digital downloads. Billboard named "Bailando" its number 38 song of 2014. "Bailando" was certified triple platinum by the RIAA on 27 August 2015, because of its sales and streamings.

The song first charted on the Hot Latin Songs chart at number 6. In its third week, it topped the chart, becoming his third consecutive single from Sex and Love to hit number one on the chart and his 25th number-one single on the Hot Latin Songs chart. By 28 February 2015, the song had spent 41 consecutive weeks on top of the chart, making the song the longest-run at number one, beating the record set by Shakira, when her song "La Tortura" spent 25 non-consecutive weeks at the top in 2005. This record was later broken in 2017 when "Despacito" by Luis Fonsi and Daddy Yankee featuring Justin Bieber spent 56 weeks on top of the Hot Latin Songs chart. The single also debuted on the Latin Pop Songs chart at number 34 and on Tropical Songs chart at number 39.

In the rest of Europe also, the single was a success. It became a top ten hit in Portugal, Romania, Ukraine, Belgium, Switzerland, Italy, Finland, Netherlands, Russia, Luxembourg, Poland, Serbia, Bulgaria and Slovakia, top 20 hit in France, Czech Republic, Greece and Turkey, top 40 hit in Austria, Germany and Hungary, and a top 50 hit in Sweden. In addition to the Spanish charts, "Bailando" topped the European charts in Portugal, Romania, Italy, Finland, Poland, Serbia and Slovakia.

In the UK and Ireland, however, "Bailando" performed poorly, resulting in its peak at number 75 on the UK Singles Chart and only staying on the chart for a week. In Ireland, the song debuted at 92, and managed a peak of 72, staying for 6 weeks on the Irish charts. Enrique Iglesias marked his return in the French charts by reaching number 12, his last single that entered French charts was "Dirty Dancer" in 2011. In Italy, the song reached number one, making it his highest-charting single there since 2010's Euphoria hit song "I Like It", and has enjoyed 13 weeks at number one.

In Latin America, the song reached number one in Mexico, Colombia, and hit the top 20 in Brazil.

On the Canadian Hot 100, the Spanish version of the song debuted at number 52, then peaking to number 13, making this song his first Spanish single to peak into the top 20. It was also his highest-charting single from Sex and Love on the Canadian Hot 100.

Accolades 
The song gave Iglesias three Latin Grammys including Song of the Year. This was his first win since 2003 when the singer won the Latin Grammy Award for Best Pop Vocal Album, Male for Quizás. Apart from song of the year, Bailando won Best Urban Performance and Best Urban Song award also at the Latin Grammys 2014.

Charts

Weekly charts

Year-end charts

Decade-end charts

All-time charts

Certifications

Release history

See also
 List of number-one dance singles of 2014 (U.S.)
List of Billboard Hot Latin Songs and Latin Airplay number ones of 2014
List of Billboard Hot Latin Songs and Latin Airplay number ones of 2015
 List of most-viewed YouTube videos
Notes
 signifies a Spanglish version
 signifies Brazilian Portuguese version featuring Luan Santana

References

2014 singles
Enrique Iglesias songs
Sean Paul songs
2014 songs
Songs written by Descemer Bueno
Universal Republic Records singles
Number-one singles in Spain
Number-one singles in Colombia
Songs involved in plagiarism controversies
Telenovela theme songs
Latin Grammy Award for Song of the Year
Monitor Latino Top General number-one singles
Number-one singles in the Dominican Republic
Latin Grammy Award for Best Urban Song
Latin Grammy Award for Best Urban Fusion/Performance
Gente de Zona songs
Songs written by Enrique Iglesias
Songs about dancing
Songs containing the I–V-vi-IV progression